An acrostic ring is a Victorian romantic 19th century ring in which the initials of the precious stones mounted on the band spell out a word such as dearest or  regards.

Dearest ring
In terms of design, the most common forms are either as a straight line with stones arranged to 'spell' the intended word, and octagon or daisy shapes. The word "dearest" is an acronym, spelled out with seven stones:
 diamond
 emerald
 amethyst or alexandrite
 ruby
 emerald
 sapphire
 topaz

Regards ring
A regards ring was a 19th century ring in which the initials of the precious stones mounted on the band spelled out the word "regards" in an implicit acrostic:
Ruby
Emerald
Garnet
Amethyst
Ruby
Diamond
Sapphire

Others
Other terms of affection spelled out in gemstones include adore (amethyst, diamond, opal, ruby, emerald), and love (lapis lazuli, opal, vermarine, emerald), Other terms of affection found in rings include the French souvenir. Later variations included the spelling of another word or a person's name. In some cases paste gems were use rather than precious stones.

Traditionally, these rings, though seen as romantic and tokens of love, were not given as engagement rings.

References

External links
 Thomas Crofton Croker, Catalogue of a collection of ancient and mediaeval rings and personal ornaments formed for lady Londesborough, London, 1853
 Fred W. Burgess, Antique Jewellery and Trinkents, New York, 1919

Rings (jewellery)
Engagement
Pre-wedding
Victorian culture